Don Peters Halsey (December 29, 1870 – June 30, 1938) was an American Democratic politician who served twice as a member of the Virginia Senate, representing the state's 20th district from 1902 to 1904 and again from 1908 to 1912.

References

External links

1870 births
1938 deaths
Democratic Party Virginia state senators
Politicians from Lynchburg, Virginia
20th-century American politicians